Disclosed (揭秘) is a Singaporean Chinese investigative thriller drama which started on 28 October 2013, focusing on cybercrime cases which involve Internet fraud, celebrity privacy, online money laundering and such. It stars Tender Huang , Jesseca Liu , Andie Chen , Shane Pow & Tang Lingyi as casts of this series. The show aired at 9pm on weekdays. The series revolves around an elite team of PR specialists who specialize in cybercrimes.

The series is the 10th top-rated drama serial at 9pm for 2013, with an average viewership of 772,000. It is also the lowest-rated drama serial among three dramas which were produced by Wawa Pictures and aired by Channel 8 (The Oath had 915,000, and was the 3rd top-rated series at 9pm for 2011; Game Plan was within the top six, with 851,000). Possibly due to this, it was the first Wawa production to garner not a single nomination for Star Awards 20.

Plot
‘Disclosed’ revolves around a group of Public Relations (PR) specialists who helps high society clients perform damage control and maintain a favourable image. The team is led by computer forensic, Wen Chang Yu (Tender Huang), who is highly intelligent and will resort to all means to crack a case. He looks like an optimist but he is actually bothered by a secret until he meets righteous Kuang Yun Xiang (Jesseca Liu). Bound by a superior-subordinate relationship, because of their differences in opinions, Chang Yu and Yun Xiang often bicker with each other. Gradually, they fell in love, being by loggerheads by day at work and lovers by night. ‘Disclosed’ is a concept derived from true accounts of social media cases involving Internet fraud and cybercrimes, where a secret is never a secret as long as social media exist. Each case covers 2 to 3 thrilling episodes.

Cast

Main cast

Supporting cast

Overseas broadcast

According to series premiere date:

See also
Wawa Pictures
List of Disclosed episodes
List of programmes broadcast by Mediacorp Channel 8

References

Singapore Chinese dramas